China Foundation for Poverty Alleviation (CFPA) is a nongovernmental charitable organization in Beijing, China, registered under the Chinese Ministry of Civil Affairs in 1989 and professionally supervised by the State Council Leading Group Office of Poverty Alleviation and Development.

In 2017, CFPA raised poverty alleviation funds and materials totaling RMB 580 million (about US$91 million) to deliver aid and assistance in over 4.2 million individual cases for impoverished persons and disaster victims. To date CFPA has raised total funds and materials worth RMB 34 billion (est. USD 5.7 billion) and delivered aid and assistance in 33 million individual cases.

CFPA's first international project was realized in the wake of the 2004 Indian Ocean tsunami when the organization raised funds for affected disaster victims.

Since then CFPA has expanded overseas to help those in need across the world, and is actively campaigning for more Chinese CSOs to launch humanitarian projects abroad while advocating for favorable government policies facilitating overseas operations. As of 2017, CFPA has undertaken work in 19 countries outside China and has long-term projects in 5 countries; Myanmar, Nepal, Ethiopia, Uganda and Sudan, with registered offices in Nepal and Myanmar.

Overview 
China Foundation for Poverty Alleviation (CFPA) is a nongovernmental charitable organization based in Beijing, registered at the Ministry of Civil Affairs, PRC, in 1989 and professionally supervised by the State Council Leading Group Office of Poverty Alleviation and Development. In 2016, CFPA raised poverty alleviation funds and materials totaling RMB 456 million (est. US$67 million) to deliver aid and assistance in over 33 million individual cases for impoverished persons and disaster victims. By the end of 2017, CFPA had accumulatively raised poverty alleviation funds and material of RMB 34.095 billion (est. USD 5.3 billion). The beneficiaries in the impoverished condition and the disaster areas reached 29,087,200 person-time.

CFPA's first international project was realized in the wake of the 2004 Indian Ocean tsunami when the organization raised funds for affected disaster victims. Since then CFPA has expanded overseas to help those in need across the world, and is actively campaigning for more Chinese CSOs to launch humanitarian projects abroad while advocating for favorable government policies facilitating overseas operations. As of 2017, CFPA has undertaken work in 19 countries outside China and has long-term projects in 5 countries; Myanmar, Nepal, Ethiopia, Uganda and Sudan, with registered offices in Nepal and Myanmar.

 Our Vision: Be the best trusted, the best expected and the best respected international philanthropy platform
 Our Mission: Disseminate good and reduce poverty, help others to achieve their aims, and make the good more powerful
 Our Values: Service, Innovation, Transparency, Tenacity
 Slogan: Persistence Brings Change

Domestic Work 
CFPA is committed to disbursing donor funds in the most effective way possible to combat rural poverty and stimulate development in remote regions. Our domestic programs target four areas in poverty reduction to increase the quality of the life for rural populations.

Poverty Alleviation & Development Programs

To Improve The Health Conditions 
CFPA has launched, in 2000 and 2008, projects as “Maternal and Infant Health 120 Action” and “nutritious meals” to help poor mothers and children to boost the inpatient delivery rate among pregnant and lying-in women, reduce maternal mortality, and improve maternal and child life support level and health level; Meanwhile, CFPA advocates the whole society to pay attention to children's nutrition condition in poverty-stricken areas. By providing extra nutrition meals and Love Kitchen facilities, CFPA improves children's growth and development condition in poor mountainous areas, reduces malnutrition rate and anaemia rate of children, promotes their health level.

Protection of Maternal and Child Health 

Since its launch in 2000, the maternal and infant health project has aimed at reducing maternal and child mortality and infant mortality, and improving maternal and child health protection and health levels in poverty-stricken areas. It has successively launched the Maternal and Infant Health 120 Action Program, the vision aid program, and major illnesses project. etc. By the end of 2017, the total investment in maternal and child safety projects exceeded RMB 160 million. The project covered 23 counties (city, district) in 11 provinces (municipalities/autonomous regions) in Yunnan, Chongqing, Fujian, Ningxia, Anhui, Sichuan, Shanxi, Hebei, Hunan, Liaoning, and Beijing, with 645,000 person-times benefited.

In 2017, the maternal and child safety project invested RMB 4.802 million, benefiting 120,000 person-times. Among them, the Maternal and Child Safety 120 Action Program covered 10 counties (city, district) in five provinces (municipalities/autonomous regions), and the cumulative number of beneficiaries of the project was about 4,000 person times, and 8 critical and serious pregnant and lying-in woman were rescued; The vision aid program covered 4 counties (cities), 4 provinces, Yucheng District of Ya’an City in Sichuan Province, Chaoyang County in Liaoning Province, Lianyuan City in Hunan Province and Changting County in Fujian Province, benefiting more than 115,000 children; The hearing aid program provided language rehabilitation training for 65 hearing-impaired children and training for 15 parents; Project for two cancer of women screened 750 rural women in Yulong County, Yunnan Province for “two cancer of women”; The PKU program provided special food subsidies for 7 impoverished PKU children in Longde County.

Care for Disabled People with Dementia 

China Foundation for Poverty Alleviation, in order to actively respond to the rapid development of the aging population and solve the problem of care for the elderly, upheld the concept of “respecting the old, loving the old, and protecting the old” and started caring project for the aged, for disabled people with dementia, especially poverty-stricken and low-income senior citizens, to build a comprehensive pension service system, and provide quality professional nursing care services for the aged.

It established the public welfare care demonstration project for the aged—Ya'an CFPA Senior Care Service Center in 2017 in Ya’an, Sichuan, the first one of China Foundation for Poverty Alleviation. As of the end of 2017, the project has invested RMB 10,542,800 in total, completing adaptive decoration and transformation for the aged and provision of hardware facilities, i.e. decoration of 5,760 square meters and 156 beds for the nursing institutions for the aged. After assessing 73 senior people with disability and mental retardation in Ya’an, the center has already received the first batch of the elderly in December 2017. Since its inception, the project, relying on the care of institutions for the aged with disability and mental retardation, has influenced community and home-based care services for the aged. It has benefited 450 elderly people in total, of which 80 are disabled people with dementia. In the same year, it established the “Time Bank” volunteer system, and more than 100 volunteers provided voluntary services for the disabled people with dementia.

Improvement of Children Nutrition 

Since the launch of the Nutritious Meals Project in 2008, it has improved the nutritional status of children in poverty-stricken areas approximately RMB 220 million. At home, it covers 87 counties (districts) in remote mountainous areas, 44 states (cities) in 14 provinces, Yunnan, Sichuan, Guangxi, Guizhou, Hunan, Hubei, Liaoning, Hebei, Fujian, Henan, Xinjiang, Heilongjiang, Anhui and Jiangxi, benefited more than 792,000 people, provided more than 44.8 million meals for the students, and established 1,445 standardized love kitchens; In foreign countries, in addition to school feeding programs for Cambodia, Nepal and other countries, the project provided 741 thousand packs of VitaMeal for 590,000 person-times for children in 20 provinces across the country, worth RMB 146 million.

In 2017, the Nutritious Meals Project invested RMB 39.688 million (excluding VitaMeal). In China, it covered 38 remote areas in 28 cities (states) in 13 provinces including Sichuan, Yunnan, Hunan, Guangxi, Guizhou, Liaoning, Hebei, Henan, Fujian, Xinjiang, Jiangxi, Heilongjiang and Anhui, provided more than 5.6 million nutrition meals for the students, established 283 standardized love kitchens, and benefited more than 142,000 person-times for students; In foreign countries, it provided 3.42 million nutrition meals for over Cambodia's 17,000 students. Moreover, it provided nearly 57,000 packs of Vita Meal for 25,000 person-times for children in 3 counties in provinces of Yunnan and Guizhou, valued at RMB 10.03 million.

Equality in Education 
The development of the economy in the remote areas of old and young people in China is slow, the parents have to leave the countryside to work in cities. As the guardian is absent, the basic rights of stay-at-home children are not guaranteed; The educational resources in poor areas are scarce, and the quality of music, physical education and other courses is not ideal; The school supplies for students in poverty-stricken areas is in shortage, and winter clothing is in lack during the winter; Many rural elementary school dormitories have been in disrepair for a long time, and the plan of relocation and school consolidation has exacerbated the difficulty of student accommodation in poverty-stricken areas. Poor high school students and poor college students face difficulties in living expenses. To this end, China Foundation for Poverty Alleviation launched programs such as Child Companion Plan, Moving Forward Plan, Love Package, School Dormitory, and New Great Wall College Students Scholarship to promote the comprehensive development of rural students in poverty-stricken areas and improve their living conditions.

Through the establishment of a Child Companion's home and the recruitment of Children Companions to take care of stay-at-home children, the basic rights of stay-at-home children were protected; Created future space, set up a refueling classroom, and helped poor children develop in an all-round way; Issued Love Package, organized training for music and physical education teacher, and improved the audio-visual teaching status and learning conditions in rural elementary schools in poverty-stricken areas; Assisted in construction of student dormitories and libraries for townships in poverty-stricken areas to solve the problems of poor student accommodation in poverty-stricken areas; Helped them complete their studies and realize their dream of becoming talent, through the economic subsidy and talent support for impoverished high school students and impoverished college students.

Care Package Loving Heart 
Since its inception in 2009, the Love Package project has improved the comprehensive development and living conditions of rural pupils in poverty-stricken areas by organizing donations of care packages. It has given children caring love and helped children round their childhood dreams. As of the end of 2017, a total of RMB 613,729,500 of donation was received, of which 3,294,700 donations were donated by individuals and 272,600 came from the unit. The project benefited 24,867 schools and 5,378,400 students in 752 counties of 31 provinces (municipalities/autonomous regions) and 6,549 families.

In 2017, the Love Package project received RMB 81.2427 million in donations, donated and purchased 613,464 student-type art packages, 99,273 student-type warm packages, 210 student-type living packages, which benefited 712,944 students from 3,645 schools in 149 counties in 27 provinces (municipalities/autonomous regions).

To Build Warm School and Dormitory 
On October 17, 2011, China Foundation for Poverty Alleviation officially launched the School Dormitory that aimed to build student dormitories for the poor in rural areas and to provide a warm home for poor students. The project received strong support from the CCTV news channel, which has aroused widespread concern from all walks of life. Many caring enterprises and caring people have made generous contributions. As of the end of 2017, the project received subscribed donations of more than RMB 120 million, and 220 school dormitories have been built in 206 counties in 19 provinces across the country, benefiting approximately 93,000 people. In 2017, the project helped build 16 school buildings, and the number of beneficiaries was approximately 5,400. In 2017, the project received RMB 1,144,400 of donations and invested RMB 5,193,500.

To Help Poverty-Stricken Students 
The New Great Wall High School Student Scholarship was an accurate poverty alleviation project, which took high middle school students with family financial difficulties as assistance object, and provided them with financial assistance and talent support services.

By the end of 2017, the project had covered 246 counties in 27 provinces (municipalities/autonomous regions), and established 554 self-strengthening classes in 274 high middle schools. The project received a donation of RMB 107.951 million in accumulation, directly benefiting 64,600 people and helping more than 21,500 high school students complete their studies and develop the spirit of self-reliance and self-supporting.

No Child Left Behind 
According to statistics, China currently has about 40 million poor children and 9.02 million stay-at-home children. China Foundation for Poverty Alleviation, in order to fully grasp the information of stay-at-home children and children in difficulties, obtain and transmit children's needs and provide child welfare services, launched the care program- Child Companion Plan for stay-at-home children in October 2015 in cooperation with public welfare organizations, government agencies, research institutions, and caring enterprises. Child Companion Plan, through the establishment of the mode of “One Person, One Home, One Link”, centering on “Child Companion”, taking “Child Companion’s home” as the platform, established a monitoring network for stay-at-home children and explored effective ways to protect the welfare, rights and interests of stay-at-home children in rural areas, which provided the basis for government decision-making.

As of the end of 2017, the Child Companion Plan has received more than RMB 23 million in donations from the public and enterprises. The program has currently covered 203 villages in 20 counties (including 91 poverty-stricken villages) in 11 cities (states) in Sichuan and Guizhou provinces, reaching nearly 100,000 children, and collecting and resolving child welfare needs for over 25,000 cases. The project has been welcomed and affirmed by local governments, partners, children and parents. With the support of local partners, the project model was copied in 600 villages in Sichuan and Guizhou provinces.

In 2017, the project collected and solved needs of children's welfare protection for more than 18,000 cases. The Child Companion visited more than 80,000 people at household, and 270,000 children participated in activities of Child Companion's home, together with 67,000 parents. In 2018, new projects will be carried out successively in Huize County, Yiliang County, and Yongshan County in Wumeng Mountainous Area of Yunnan Province, and Luoxiao Mountainous Area of Jiangxi Province.

Moving Forward 
The “Moving Forward Plan” is a developmental philanthropy project launched by China Foundation for Poverty Alleviation that promotes the development of children in poverty-stricken areas and facilitates equity in urban and rural education. The project aims to improve learning for children in poverty-stricken areas through continuous social care and professional support and share quality educational resources.

The Moving Forward Plan takes poverty-stricken counties as the project's implementation area. In conjunction with the local county education department, the Moving Forward Plan is implemented in a certain percentage of primary schools throughout the county. It will be carried out continuously for 6–10 years to help the children in poverty-stricken areas develop in an all-round way. Through the demonstration and scale effect of the project schools, the local education policy will be changed and the overall education level will be promoted.

As of the end of 2017, the project received a total of RMB 23,132,600 in donations, and invested RMB 19.9992 million, of which RMB 14.615 million was received in 2017 and RMB 14.808 million invested. The project covered Weining County in Guizhou Province, Zhenxiong County in Yunnan Province and Longlin County in Guangxi Province, etc. in the three poverty-stricken counties, 24,653 students and 927 teachers benefited cumulatively.

Rural Livelihoods 
The poverty-stricken and vulnerable populations of the old and the young in remote and poor areas, were in a disadvantaged position in the market competition due to lack of financial support, small scale of production, or inconvenient transportation, and it is slow for them to improve living quality. China Foundation for Poverty Alleviation, in order to provide poverty-stricken areas and impoverished populations with opportunities for more development benefits in the market economy, actively provided credit services to poor households, strived to improve the basic production and living conditions in rural areas, helped establish rural cooperatives, and excavated local resources to build beautiful countryside, and linked markets to promote e-commerce poverty alleviation through innovation and development.

Micro-finance Self-Reliance 
CFPA Micro-finance is a small and micro financial institution that focuses on the rural market. Its main purpose is to tailor the micro-finance, insurance, wealth management, e-commerce and other multi-directional services to those rural low and middle-income groups that cannot fully enjoy the services of traditional financial institutions, help them develop their industries, increase their income, and realize a better life as soon as possible.

As of the end of 2017, CFPA Micro-finance Project covered 21 provinces across the country and had 258 branches, of which more than 70% are national-level poverty-stricken counties, and others were under-developed counties or earthquake-stricken counties. More than 2.07 million pieces of amounts and more than RMB 27.8 billion have been issued, which helped and supported more than 5 million rural households.

In 2017, a total of 411,500 pieces of loans and RMB 8.623 billion were issued, average loan amount was RMB 20,953, 382,000 people were loan customers, the loan balance was RMB 5.94 billion, the average household balance was RMB 15,555, and the risk loan rate for more than 30 days was 0.94%. Of our loan customers, 92.7% were rural households, 82.9% were women, and 89.5% were at education level of junior high school and below.

Convenient Bridge in Village 
The Bridge Construction Project was a philanthropy project jointly organized by China Foundation for Poverty Alleviation, Jiangling Motors Co., Ltd., China Association of Automobile Journalists and China Automotive News in 2007, it aimed at “building love and letting rivergoers have their bridge” to assist the poverty-stricken areas to build convenience bridges.

By the end of 2017, a total of RMB 47.16 million from donation had been donated, and 694 projects had been implemented cumulatively. The project covered 144 counties in 24 provinces, and the number of direct beneficiaries totaled more than one million. 
In 2017, the project received RMB 6.56 million of donations and managed and implemented a total of 94 projects, covering 28 counties in 11 provinces. The number of beneficiaries reached 148,708 person-times. 50 projects were completed throughout the year and a total of RMB 5.953 million was invested in accumulation.

NGO Cooperation in Community Development 
The NGO Cooperation is a project funded by China Foundation for Poverty Alleviation, it mainly focuses on solving social problems, and gathers philanthropy partners of innovative spirits and initial nature, with effective collaboration as a means and effectiveness and change as orientation, to explore more effective solutions for social problems.

After years of development, NGO Cooperation has already formed brand projects such as “Everyone Philanthropy”, “ME Funding for Philanthropy Innovation”, “Community Development Plan”, and “Gongyi Baobei Joint Fundraising Program”.

In addition, the Philanthropy Team launched the “Action and Influence Support Program” in 2017 and Philanthropy Seed NGO Propaganda Support Program, and the Philanthropy Team (Philanthropy Partners’ Annual Meeting of 2017), which provided more systematic support for the partners’ operation of institution and influence transmission.

Beautiful Village 
“Beautiful Village” project is dedicated to building a rural and external connection platform to re-evaluate the value of poor villages and create village-based development opportunities. Guided by the idea of “targeted poverty alleviation”, through such methods as “scenic spots driving villages, talented people drive households”, the project actively introduced social funds, information, and talents and other elements to promote sustainable development in rural areas.
 
As of the end of 2017, the project has received a total of RMB 127 million in donated funds, with a total of RMB 44.5 million invested in accumulation. The project involved 13 poverty-stricken villages in 12 national-level poverty-stricken counties, benefiting a total of 15,307 people of 3,909 households.

In 2017, RMB 9.2 million was invested, 5 villages had been operated, total operating income was RMB 3.96 million, and the total converting income of villagers was 2.29 million, and it drove 155 villagers to be employed, including 91 from poor households; per capita salary income was of RMB 21,225, and it achieved per capita dividend of RMB 197.7. 8 new project villages in 2017 are expected to be fully operational by 2018.

Fair-Trade E-Commerce 
Fair-Trade E-Commerce is the brand of e-commerce poverty alleviation established by China Foundation for Poverty Alleviation. With the mission of “Making honesty and production realize value”, the production end adopts rural cooperatives as the carrier of the organization, empowers producers, and promotes agricultural product cultivation standards and product quality; The consumer side uses the E-Commerce as a unified brand, empowers consumers to promote group purchases through e-commerce and community links, and helps farmers in poverty-stricken areas to increase income and get rid of poverty while meeting the needs of consumers for safe and healthy agricultural products, and promotes to resolve food safety issues in China.

As of the end of 2017, the total number of peasant households that benefited from the project has reached 10,000, and average household income of cooperative farmers has reached RMB 3,000. Fair-Trade E-Commerce produced a total of 6 products including Shimian yellow orange, Shimian loquat, Hanyuan red cherry, Mengdingshan kiwifruit, Honghe terraced red rice and Jilin Shulan rice. In 2017, Fair-Trade E-Commerce went out from Sichuan, the project has covered Ya’an in Sichuan, Honghe in Yunnan, and Shulan in Jilin. It has footprints in 18 counties in 6 provinces in China, most of which are national-level poverty-stricken counties.

In 2017, there were 3,590 households and 10,770 people benefited. Fair-Trade E-Commerce carried out 100 user visits, organized 200 community training sessions, filmed 12 video documentaries, held 3 farmers’ film festivals, called for 500 new media for reports, and obtained support of 21 artists.

Humanitarian Aid 
China is a country prone to natural disasters. Poverty caused by disasters and returning to poverty due to disasters is one of the major causes of poverty. China Foundation for Poverty Alleviation began implementing emergency aid projects in 2003. Aim to alleviate the suffering and anxiety of compatriots in poverty-stricken areas and improve the timeliness and pertinence of disaster response. Advocate and promote the cooperation between the government and non-government organizations in the field of disaster relief. Establish humanitarian aid network, set up Humanitarian Aid Team of China Foundation for Poverty Alleviation, conduct training on disaster prevention and reduction, strengthen the capacity building and network construction of related parties, and carry out people-oriented post-disaster reconstruction.

Disaster Relief Begins with You 
In 2003, China Foundation for Poverty Alleviation started a disaster relief project. Since its establishment, it has carried out 177 disaster relief operations, invested 1.604 billion RMB in disaster relief materials and directly benefited 5.8363 million people, covering 31 provinces (municipalities/autonomous regions).

In 2017, the disaster relief project received donations 27,343,200 RMB, include funds 9.006 million RMB and materials 18.3372 million RMB. 23 disaster relief operations were launched in succession in the 11 Chinese provinces (municipalities/autonomous regions) and North Korea, disaster reduction and prevention work was carried out in 30 cities from 18 provinces (municipalities/autonomous regions). Raised funds and materials valuing 26.5369 million, benefiting 215,400 person-times.

Post-disaster Reconstruction 
The April 20 Lushan post-earthquake reconstruction project was established by CFPA on May 12, 2013, for carrying out the Lushan post-earthquake reconstruction and livelihood improvement in the disaster areas. By the end of 2017, it had received social donations worth 304.0424 million RMB, and the cumulative expenditure was 255.1734 million RMB in total. The project benefited more than 150,000 people (person-time) in 140 villages in 70 towns of 9 counties and districts of Ya’an city and Chongzhou city.

The August 3 Ludian post-earthquake reconstruction project was established by CFPA in August 2014 for carrying out the Ludian post-earthquake reconstruction and livelihood improvement in the disaster areas. By the end of 2017, it had received social donations worth 147.4830 million RMB, and the cumulative expenditure was 131.6326 million RMB in total. The project benefited more than 50,000 people (person-time) in 15 towns of Ludian County, Huize County, and Qiaojia County.

To Promote The Concept Of Everyone Philanthropy And Actively Advocate Great Love Of Human Beings 
In recent years, CFPA took the"everyone philanthropy"as the focus of the public participation in charity, cooperated actively with the various parties, and held the popular philanthropy advocacy activities. In recent years, CFPA has initiated such public-oriented projects as"Donate One Yuan, Give Benevolence, Offer Nutrition", “Together with Walmart for Extra Meals”,“the Great Walkers”,“Unite the Force for Good, Charity Future Project”,“Love Knows No Border”, further deepen the concept of public benefit in the mind of everyone.

In 2017, CFPA continued to organize and implement advocacy activities such as the Great Walkers, Hunger 24, “Donate One Yuan, Give Benevolence, Offer Nutrition” and “Together with Walmart for Extra Meals”. Moreover, CFPA sponsored the “Love Knows No Border” International Charity Sale with the Ministry of Foreign Affairs, carried out 99 charity day and Gongyi Baobei plan on third-party platform and tried the advocacy activity of “Young Philanthropy Advocacy Officer”.

In 2017, 2.88 billion individual donations were made, and 48000 volunteers provided 205,000 hours of volunteer service .

Great Walkers Bring Changes At Every Step 
Great Walkers is a large-scale outdoor philanthropic hiking event that combines public welfare and sports. It is the first public benefit-hiking event of 100 kilometers in Chinese mainland and launched by CFPA in 2014. The event encourages participants to form a team of four people jointly overcome difficulties by walking day and night to complete the hiking challenge of 50 or 100 kilometers within specified time. With the belief of “Great Walkers bring changes at every step”, the event mobilizes people around us to support public welfare through actions and contribute to the comprehensive development of children in poverty-stricken areas.

By the end of 2016, more than 14,000 people in 5761 teams from over 10 countries have participated in Great Walkers events, 9933 people completed the challenge. 14735 (person-time) volunteers participated from over 150 cities in China. Aggregate donations of 18.96 million RMB. There were 197,000 effective donations, totaling 120,000 benefit Children (person-time), supported by more than 50 enterprises, 40 stars and hundreds media reported this activity.

In 2017, the “Great Walkers” activity came out of Beijing and successfully held in Chengdu and Nanjing. A total number of 6916 people participated in the activity, and 4192 people successfully completed the challenge. It totally raised RMB 7675897.03 for charity, of which RMB 1666134.1 was used for the Children Companion project; RMB 1,240,591.2 was used for Public Benefit Team project; RMB 1400,477.28 was used for Love Package; RMB 2,768,637.95 was used to build a love kitchen; RMB 600,056.5 was used for the Xuhang scholarship program.

Unite the Force for Good, Inspires Volunteerism 
The Unite the Force for Good project is a large-scale volunteer fundraising activity launched by China Foundation for Poverty Alleviation in 2011. The activity advocates volunteers to carry out philanthropy propaganda and fundraising. Through philanthropy activity to pass 100% kindness, gather the forces of love of the whole society, care and love the children in poverty-stricken areas. The project advocates college students to provide volunteer service for 100 hours, shopping malls to provide venues for 100 hours, and the public to donate 100 RMB.

By the end of 2017, the project has been implemented 13 times in total, there were 31 provinces (municipalities/autonomous regions), 124 cities, 279 colleges and universities, and more than 304,000 university student volunteers participating in the project, and the project accumulatively raised funds of RMB 65,092,400 for the primary school students in poverty-stricken areas and disaster-hit areas .
 
In 2017, the Unite the Force for Good activity called 43,000 university volunteers to raise nearly 70,000 Love Packages for the primary school students in poverty-stricken areas, and show the love of all sectors of the society to them. There were 40,815 college students from 81 colleges and universities participating in the 2017 “Unite the Force for Good-Warm action”, and the activity raised 8.9424 million RMB; 2017 Unite the Force for Good Happy monthly donation season called for 2620 college students from 41 colleges and universities to participate in, and invited 13498 public to join the monthly donation.

Charity Future Promotes The Development of Youth Philanthropy 
The Charity Future for Youth Project is a Youth Capacity Development project launched by the China Foundation for Poverty Alleviation in 2013. Aims to integrate social resources, support the development of charitable organizations in colleges and universities, promote the participation of university students in public benefit, and encourage young people to use innovative ways to explore solutions of social problems, to cultivate a new generation of young people with creativity, teamwork and social responsibility, to create a better future together.

By the end of 2017, the Charity Future has developed into a platform combining the public benefit youth college, the public benefit creation fund, and the public benefit × practical action. Successively carried out Wrigley Garbage Collection, Citigroup College Student Financial Quality Education Training, China Petroleum Social Practice Fund, SAP Youth Responsibility Dream +, Hilton Social Practice Project, and Good Deeds 100, etc. projects. Over the past five years, a total number of 567 organizations from 457 colleges and universities in more than 30 provinces (municipalities/autonomous regions) have received support, 1,455 organization leaders have received training opportunities, and 700,000 young people have benefited.

In 2017, the Charity Future project has covered 565 charitable organizations from 320 colleges and universities in 117 cities across the country, directly affecting 200,000 university students.

Donate One Yuan, Give Benevolence, Offer Nutrition 
In 2017, China Foundation for Poverty Alleviation in concert with KFC, Pizza Hut and other brands of Yum (China) Investment Co., Ltd., jointly launched the 10th “Donate One Yuan, Give Benevolence, Offer Nutrition” nationwide fundraising activity. To call on the entire society to donate RMB one to provide a nutrition lunch for children in poverty-stricken areas for one year, and donate love kitchen equipment for schools in poverty-stricken areas. The project sets up a donation platform for “public charity”, taking “one RMB” as the threshold of philanthropy for every people and encouraging the whole society to “support Philanthropy” at any time through a series of small actions of “donating one RMB”.  Advocating "do not think any vice trivial, and so practice it," and promoting the charity concept that "everyone can be charitable", thereby, everyone can participate in public benefit by this activity, more people's love and social responsibility are inspired and cultivated.

By the end of 2017, the Donate One Yuan project has provided more than 37.4 million nutritious meals for the 547,000 primary school students in poverty-stricken mountainous areas in Sichuan, Yunnan, Guizhou, Hubei, Guangxi, Hunan, Fujian, Hebei, Heilongjiang and Xinjiang. Provided standard “love kitchen equipment” including electric stoves, rice cookers, sterilizers, workbench and exhaust fans for 860 poverty-stricken mountain schools. In the past 10 years since the donation of RMB one project, it has raised a total amount of 170 million RMB, and attracted 110 million people to participate.

In 2017, the Donate One Yuan one project began on July 8 and ended on July 30, which lasted 23 days. In 2017, the Donate One Yuan project received more than 19.36 million RMB for charity, and attracted more than 10 million people to participate.

Together with Walmart for Extra Meals 
From August 17 to August 30, 2017, the China Foundation for Poverty Alleviation, together with Walmart and PepsiCo, launched “the 3rd Together with Walmart for Extra Meals” activity. With the joint efforts of the partners and the strong support of consumers, in 2017, the “Together with Walmart for Extra Meals” activity totally received 3.06 million RMB for charity.

Gongyi Baobei 
The Gongyi Baobei project is the product with the symbol "*" on Taobao (Tmall symbol is "*"). The seller voluntarily participates in the Gongyi Baobei program and sets a certain proportion of donations when selling their goods. After the goods is sold, the seller will donate a certain amount of money to the designated public benefit project for related philanthropy undertakings and promoting the concept of charity consumption.

By the end of 2017, the Gongyi Baobei project has received the donation of 250 million RMB in total. Accumulatively granted 158 million RMB for the Love Package project. 18.36 million RMB for the pillar project. 6.57 million RMB for the Smiling Children project. 1.3172 million RMB for the Blue Sky Aid project. 10.83 million RMB for the Children Companion project. 3.2 million RMB for the Paukphaw scholarship project in Myanmar and 53.9 million RMB for 28 NGO joint fundraising projects. 
In 2017, China Foundation for Poverty Alleviation raised 110 million RMB in donations through Gongyi Baobei. Supported 43.63 million RMB for Love Package projects (including 2 million RMB for international Love Package projects), 18.36 million RMB for the pillar project, 4.13 million RMB for the smiling children project, and 4.7 million RMB for Children Companion, 3.2 million RMB for the Paukphaw scholarship project in Myanmar, and 36.9 million RMB for the 28 NGO joint fundraising projects.

95 Charity Week 
From September 1 to September 5, China Foundation for Poverty Alleviation and Alibaba jointly started the first "95 Charity Week". The Alibaba Group issued the proposal that" Everyone donates 3 hours to support the public benefit together" to the society, called on everyone to donate 3 hours each year to practice public benefit activities, let charity actions change themselves, change lives, and arouse more people's mercy, goodwill and good deeds, so as to bring about a small and beautiful change to the world, and realize the vision of “bluer sky and warmer heart”.

During the  95 Charity Week, 10 projects of the China Foundation for Poverty Alleviation launched the fundraising activities in the online stores, well-known actors Zhang Yishan and Zhang Yunlong had participated in the fundraising activities. RMB 267,000 donations were received through activities, and the exposure of the activity reached 1 billion times.

Moving forward Project 
The Moving forward Project advocates urban families with children aged 5–15 to join the monthly donation. Through the participation of parent & child information broadcasting, philanthropy courses, and philanthropy activities, the children's sense of responsibility and empathy can be cultivated, so that they can learn to love and share. By the end of 2017, a total number of 12,000 people had participated in the monthly donation and 25,000 primary school students in poverty-stricken areas benefited.

In 2017, the “Moving forward Project” WeChat official account has cumulatively upload 139 domestic and international philanthropy stories to 180,000 users. Raising users’ awareness of the philanthropy and expanding their charity view. Through the 3rd little charity publicity officer activity, it has attracted more than 5,000 urban children to participate in the project, and introduced the “Growing up together” project to more than 70,000 people. The monthly donors visiting activities were held 3 times in the whole year. Nearly 100 groups of monthly donors visited the project area to learn about the use of donations and to experience the actual life of the rural children.

99 Charity Day 
"99 Charity Day" is an annual philanthropy event that is jointly initiated by Tencent philanthropy Organization and hundreds of philanthropy organizations, well-known enterprises, star celebrities, and top-level creativity institutions. September 9, 2015 is China's first charity day.

During 99 Charity Day period in 2017, 971,206 people donated on 372 self-owned projects of CFPA and social organization cooperation projects, collecting the donations of 64.6627 million RMB, among which the fund raised by the public was 40.8442 million RMB. The donations of Tencent were 15.457 million RMB. The donations of enterprises were 7.8087 million RMB, and the matching donations of Surprise Moment were 251,600 RMB. Donations were mainly used to help children, the elderly, disable people, and other poor and disadvantaged groups.

Love Knows No Border 
The “Love Knows No Border” international charity sale event was initiated by Ms. Qian Wei, wife of the Minister of Foreign Affairs in 2017, and jointly organized by the Ministry of Foreign Affairs of the People's Republic of China and the China Foundation for Poverty Alleviation. The activity raised more than RMB 3.352 million in total.

On October 29, 2017, the 9th "Love Knows No Border" international charity sale with the theme of "Building a Healthy Home in Yunnan” was held at the Workers’ Stadium. The funds raised by the activity were used to build health clinics in Jinping County of Honghe Autonomous Prefecture and Malipo County of Wenshan Autonomous Prefecture, Yunnan Province. Foreign Minister Wang Yi and his wife Ms. Qian Wei, the Secretary of the Ministry of Foreign Affairs Party Committee and Deputy Minister Zhang Yesui, Deputy Minister Wang Chao and his wife, Assistant Minister Qian Hongshan and his wife, Chen Xiaodong and his wife, Chairman of China Foundation for Poverty Alleviation Zheng Wenkai, and Executive Vice Chairman Wang Xingzui, Vice Chairman and Secretary-General Liu Wenkui and more than 140 representatives and their wives of the embassies and international organizations in China participated in the event.

The organizer hopes to use this platform to implement the concept of accurate poverty alleviation proposed by General Secretary Xi Jinping. Adhere to accurate poverty alleviation, overcome poverty, resolutely fight against poverty, and let poor people and poor areas enter the all-round well-off society together. According to the actual situation of Jinping and Malipo in Yunnan Province, the charity sale will help the two counties build village-level and township-level health clinics, so that the wish of villagers that “minor illnesses can be treated in the village and serious illnesses can be treated in the county” will come true soon.

International Work

International Disaster Relief and Development Aid Projects 
China Foundation for Poverty Alleviation upholds the concept of “love without borders, people to people” and adheres to the principle of “respecting locality and demand oriented” to carry out international aid and advocacy projects. China Foundation for Poverty Alleviation has invested a total of RMB 132 million, benefiting more than 300,000 disaster-affected or people living under poverty line in 19 countries and regions, by 2017.

China Foundation for Poverty Alleviation, with the support of local government, enterprises, partners and individual donor in 2017, focusing on the six UN 2030 Sustainable Development Goals of No poverty, zero hunger, good health well-being, quality education, clean drinking water and 
decent work and economic growth, carried out international aid projects in seven countries including Myanmar, Nepal, Ethiopia, Sudan, Cambodia and DPRK, including provide meals for African Smiling Children's school, Nepal post-disaster reconstruction, Myanmar Paukphaw Scholarship Project, Ethiopian women's vocational training, Ethiopian water cellar construction, international volunteer and other projects; a total of RMB 20.29 million was invested during the year, benefiting 91,117 beneficiaries.

CFPA actively issued the voice of Chinese social organizations and spread the concept of China's public welfare on the international stage: Co-hosted The 35th United Nations Human Rights Council “Promotion of Human Rights: Role of Poverty Eradication” sub-conference with China NGO Network for International Exchanges for International Exchanges in Geneva; Hosted the “Belt and Road, Public Benefits First” and “Sharing of International Learning Achievement” Endless Love Forum, and participated in the organization of the Forum on “Shared Dividends: Targeted Poverty Alleviation through the Internet”, the Sub-forum on Anti-Poverty and Global and Regional Governance by the World Philanthropy Forum, and the International Bazaar on “love knows no border” etc. of the 4th World Internet Conference. China Foundation for Poverty Alleviation, at the CCTV Charity Night, received the “Belt and Road” Public Benefit Practitioner Award on September 5, 2017.

Myanmar: The Paukphaw Scholarship Project 
The beneficiaries of the Myanmar Paukphaw Scholarship Program were the outstanding full-time undergraduate students who studies excellent in character and study and with economic difficulty in their family, and they were provided with the economic and talent support activities for completing their studies. In addition to provide financial aid to poor students, the project also carried out support activities of talent support to improve the ability of the students in four areas, namely project research, design and implementation capabilities, organizational and communication skills, and cross-cultural communication skills. In 2017, the project received donation from the Gong Yi Bao Beietc.. Its scale increased from 600 persons to 1300, with an expenditure of RMB 2.25 million for the year. The project area expanded from Yangon to Rakhine and Mandalay region, and a total of 6 times Paukphaw support activity of talent support activity were supported. It has a great influence in Myanmar, and a number of local media in Myanmar have positively reported project activities.

The China-Myanmar Scholarship Program were donated by the Chinese Embassy in Myanmar. It provided scholarships for outstanding primary and middle school students in Myanmar and grants subsidies for needy students. The project was officially launched in June 2017 and implemented in 20 schools in 8 provinces in Yangon, Mandalay, Sagaing, Naypyidaw, Shan State, Magwe, Bago and Rakhine State. The project has awarded a total of 397 outstanding students and granted 211 poor students with scholarships and subsidies respectively, up to RMB 760,000.

In 2017, China Foundation for Poverty Alleviation, with the donation of the Chinese Embassy in Myanmar, cooperating with the Shan State Women's Affairs Association, provided funding for the temple schools in Lashio, Shan State and other places, and carried out quality education promotion projects in Shan State. The first-phase grant amounted to nearly RMB 670,000, mainly for equipping with desks, chairs, computer classrooms, sewing machines and building toilets for schools.

China Foundation for Poverty Alleviation, in 2017, with the support of the Hong Kong South-South Education Foundation, launched a computer classroom project and provided a computer classroom for the University of Daguang. A total of 40 computers were purchased, and 1267 students in the school computer science and computer courses benefited.

Nepal: The Nepal Post-Disaster Projects 
China Foundation for Poverty Alleviation helped build 2 schools in Nepal's post-earthquake reconstruction program, in which the Yuba Sahabhagita School donated by Suning held a completion ceremony on September 19, and the Patan School donated by Beijing Geyuan Company held a ground-breaking ceremony on April 20.

China Foundation for Poverty Alleviation conducted Hepatitis B screening in the Pokhara region of Nepal. A total of 50,000 people from 51 health clinics were screened, which was the first international sanitary screening project performed in Nepal by an international NGO, with large number of people and wider coverage screened.

In view of the lack of schoolbag stationery in students of elementary and middle school in Nepal, we have introduced China's successful love package, project into Nepal. The first 700 schoolbags were distributed during the completion ceremony of the school donated by Suning, and such project would be implemented in Nepal on a scale of at least 10,000 schoolbags per year in the future.

Ethiopia 
 Smiling Children in Ethiopia
The Ethiopian Smiling Children School Feeding Program was launched in May 2015 and had run for two years and a half. China Foundation for Poverty Alleviation has raised more than RMB 7 million to feed 4,074 students in the 42 Ethiopian public schools, by the end of 2017. Funding invested in Ethiopia in 2017 was RMB 3.38 million. After the project was implemented, it attracted school drop-out children to return to school, and the drop-out rate was reduced; attendance rate has been greatly improved, students’ physical and psychological conditions have been greatly ameliorated, and their learning performance and academic results showed great advancement. It has been recognized by all sectors of Ethiopian society and received donations from local companies such as Ethiopian Airlines, Ethiopian Telecom and Midrock. At present, 20,000 students benefited from Ethiopia's smiling children school as a whole.

 Water Cellar
The water cellar project imitated rainwater harvesting technology in China's severely water-scarce mountainous areas to provide clean, reliable, and cheap water resources for household water use in developing countries. The water cellar project has three advantages in solving drought problem. First of all, the water cellar project is a development project, which not only reduces the time for water intake by farmers and the cost of water, but also provides guarantee for the economic income of farmers. Second, the water cellar has been built with the help of civil society mobilizing community participation. It is a low cost and sustainable project. Third, water cellars can continuously alleviate water shortages in arid regions. Each cellar built for assistance can continue to store water for a family of 5 members for 30 years. The first phase of the Ethiopian Water Cellar Project received a donation of RMB 750,000 from XCMG Group in 2017 and successfully built 41 water cellars in Ethiopia. Based on the successful implementation of the first phase of the water cellar project, the second phase of the 40 water cellars with donation RMB 880,000 from XCMG had been officially started.

Women's Vocational Training Program
The Women's Vocational Training Program was donated with RMB 700,000 from CGCOC Group, which was used to train 100 Ethiopian poor women in basketry and stone carving to gain income-generating skills and achieve employment or perform entrepreneurship. In 2017, the project invested RMB 350,000 and 50 women have been trained in Tigray, Ethiopia. The products produced by these women have already been sold at the market. The effect of the project was very obvious.

Sudan: Smiling Children 
The Sudan's Smiling Children School Feeding Program was launched in August 2015 and has been carrying out for two years and a half. China Foundation for Poverty Alleviation has raised more than RMB 5 million to support 3,813 students in 7 Sudan public schools, by the end of 2017, after two years and a half of project implementation. RMB 2.65 million was sent to Sudan in 2017. After the project was implemented, the students’ academic performance was greatly improved. The exam passing rate of the 8th grade in 2  schools in the Red Sea State to high school reached 100%; the physical condition of students has been greatly improved, the number of students who have taken sick leave has been significantly reduced, and the attendance rate of students has been greatly increased. The time for teachers to deal with unexpected incidents has been reduced and they can concentrate more on teaching. The project received praise from all sectors of the Sudanese society and Sudan's mainstream media reported the successful cases of the project.

China Foundation for Poverty Alleviation received donation of RMB 200,000 from the South-South Education Foundation for a computer classroom project in Sudan in 2017, which was used to provide 50 computers in the Osman Ibn Afan boys’ school, the Thoyba Girls’ School, the Humyraa Girls’ School, the Nasr Girls’ School and the Algadisya Boys' School in Khartoum, Sudan. 50 computers. Before, students in these schools could only see computers in books and had never touched any real computers. The implementation of the Computer Project would surely reduce the digital gap in sub-Saharan African countries and provide children with quality education.

Haiti: Haiti Humanitarian Aid Operation 
Hurricane Matthew made landfall in the Caribbean island nation of Haiti on October 3, 2016, razing houses, uprooting trees, inundating field and destroying municipal water supply systems. The Haitian Ministry of Defense announced on the 10th that Hurricane Mathew left at least 372 people dead, 246 people injured, over 170,000 people homeless of which 140,000 required immediate humanitarian intervention, and caused outbreaks of cholera in remote flood affected regions.
CFPA at once began to mobilize humanitarian resources, and on October 12 dispatched emergency aid workers to Haiti. CFPA surveyed the disaster site, conducted medical patrols, and distributed aid materiel in a series of operations addressing the immediate humanitarian needs of hurricane struck communities. Materiel relief provided was valued at over to US$30,000, and directly benefited over 2035 hurricane victims, and included medical supplies which was used to successfully treat 436 patients.

Ecuador: Ecuadorian Earthquake Disaster Relief 
On April 17, 2016, 7:58am, Ecuador was rocked by a 7.8-magnitude earthquake with an epicenter located at 0.371°N 79.940°W 0.371, 19.2 kilometers below ground. In the immediate aftermath, CFPA conducted damage assessment, and launched the Ecuador post-quake humanitarian relief operation. CFPA leveraged its expertise by dispatching humanitarian workers to Ecuador to assist in post-quake relief efforts from the 19th to 30 April 2016. Accompanying them was a humanitarian team sent by Pearl Humanitarian Rescue Institution (PHR). Both organizations jointly undertook 11 days’ relief operations across 9 quake sites during which we committed 45 workers and 190 man hours to humanitarian relief and rescue efforts with assistance from local volunteers. Alongside the UN international and local NGOs, the local authorities, Chinese firms in Ecuador, and the Chinese diaspora, CFPA conducted medical patrols, first aid and materiel procurement, undertook tasks in disinfection and disease prevention, and supplied clean food water in a series of operations addressing the immediate humanitarian needs of quake-struck communities. Materiel relief provided was valued at close to US$160,000, and directly benefited over 10,000 quake victims.

International Advocacy 
On the international stage, CFPA actively makes the world hear the voice of Chinese non-governmental organizations and shares the public welfare philosophy of China. The Foundation has held or participated in the EU-China Civil Society Dialogue, the 32nd session of the United Nations Human Rights Council, G20 Civil Society Conference, and other international conferences; Love Knows No Border International Charity Sale --- Building Bridge for Heart-to-heart Connectivity cosponsored by the Ministry of Foreign Affairs and our Foundation won the support of over 120 embassies in China, China offices of international organizations, and international friends. The First Lady of Ethiopia Roman Tesfaye wrote to Ms. Peng Liyuan and introduced and expressed gratitude to public welfare projects carried out in Ethiopia by our Foundation.

Accreditation and Award 
In 2007 and 2013, it was rated as the national AAAAA-grade foundation by the Ministry of Civil Affairs. In September, 2016, CFPA was accredited as one of the first charitable organizations with public fund-raising qualification by the Ministry of Civil Affairs.

References

External links 
  

Foundations based in China
Organizations established in 1989
Organizations based in Beijing